Prunus gazelle-peninsulae is a species of Prunus native to New Guinea and the Bismarck Archipelago. A few individuals have been found growing on Seram and Halmahera Islands in the Maluku Islands. It is a tree reaching , and is morphologically similar to Prunus dolichobotrys, aside from their fruit.

References

gazelle-peninsulae
Flora of the Maluku Islands
Flora of Papuasia
Plants described in 1965